Valeriy Dymo (born 9 September 1985 in Mykolaiv) is a Ukrainian swimmer who competed in the 2004 Summer Olympics, in the 2008 Summer Olympics and in the 2012 Summer Olympics.

References

1985 births
Living people
Sportspeople from Mykolaiv
Ukrainian male swimmers
Male breaststroke swimmers
Olympic swimmers of Ukraine
Swimmers at the 2004 Summer Olympics
Swimmers at the 2008 Summer Olympics
Swimmers at the 2012 Summer Olympics
European Aquatics Championships medalists in swimming
Universiade medalists in swimming
Universiade gold medalists for Ukraine
Universiade bronze medalists for Ukraine
National University of Ukraine on Physical Education and Sport alumni
Medalists at the 2005 Summer Universiade
Medalists at the 2007 Summer Universiade
21st-century Ukrainian people